Abercrombie Shire was a local government area in the Central West region of New South Wales, Australia.

Abercrombie Shire was proclaimed on 7 March 1906, one of 134 shires created after the passing of the Local Government (Shires) Act 1905. 

The shire offices were originally in Rockley and later moved to Perthville. 

Abercrombie Shire was abolished on 1 October 1977 and along with the City of Bathurst and Turon Shire was divided into a reconstituted City of Bathurst and a new Evans Shire

References

Former local government areas of New South Wales
1906 establishments in Australia
1977 disestablishments in Australia